Paulo Helber Rosa Ribeiro (born 28 June 1992) is a Brazilian footballer who plays as a midfielder for Monte Azul.

International career
Naturalised citizen of Timor-Leste, he made his senior international debut on 5 October 2012 in a 2012 AFF Suzuki Cup qualification match against Cambodia national football team.

On 19 January 2017, the Asian Football Confederation declared Paulo Helber and eleven other Brazilian footballers ineligible to represent East Timor.

References 

1992 births
Living people
Sportspeople from Minas Gerais
Brazilian footballers
Association football midfielders
Barretos Esporte Clube players
Brazilian expatriate footballers
Brazilian expatriate sportspeople in Hong Kong
Expatriate footballers in Hong Kong
Brazilian expatriate sportspeople in Laos
Expatriate footballers in Laos
United Victory players
Expatriate footballers in the Maldives

Timor-Leste international footballers
East Timorese footballers